The 2017 WGC-Mexico Championship was a golf tournament played March 2–5 at Club de Golf Chapultepec in Naucalpan, Mexico, just west of Mexico City. It was the 18th time the WGC Championship has been played, and the first of the World Golf Championships events to be staged in 2017. The approximate elevation of the course's clubhouse is  
The Championship was won by Dustin Johnson in his first tournament as the World number 1.

Course layout
Club de Golf Chapultepec

Source:

Field
The field consisted of players from the top of the Official World Golf Ranking and the money lists/Orders of Merit from the six main professional golf tours. Each player is classified according to the first category in which he qualified, but other categories are shown in parentheses.

1. The top 50 players from the Official World Golf Ranking, as of February 20, 2017
An Byeong-hun (2), Daniel Berger (2,3), Rafa Cabrera-Bello (2,5,6), Paul Casey (2,3), Kevin Chappell (2,3), Matt Fitzpatrick (2,5), Rickie Fowler (2,4), Jim Furyk (2), Sergio García (2,6), Branden Grace (2,5), Emiliano Grillo (2,3), Bill Haas (2), Tyrrell Hatton (2,5), J. B. Holmes (2,3), Yuta Ikeda (2,7), Dustin Johnson (2,3,4), Zach Johnson (2), Kevin Kisner (2,3), Russell Knox (2,3), Brooks Koepka (2), Matt Kuchar (2,3), Hideki Matsuyama (2,3,4), William McGirt (3), Rory McIlroy (2,3,5), Phil Mickelson (2,3), Francesco Molinari (2,5), Ryan Moore (2,3), Kevin Na (2,3), Alex Norén (2,5), Louis Oosthuizen (2,5), Scott Piercy (2), Thomas Pieters (2), Jon Rahm (2,4), Patrick Reed (2,3), Justin Rose (2), Charl Schwartzel (2,3), Adam Scott (2,3), Brandt Snedeker (2,3), Jordan Spieth (2,3,4), Henrik Stenson (2,5,6), Justin Thomas (2,3,4), Jimmy Walker (2,3), Wang Jeung-hun (2,5,6), Bubba Watson (2,3), Lee Westwood (2,5), Bernd Wiesberger (2,5,6), Danny Willett (2,5), Chris Wood (5), Gary Woodland (2,3,4)
Jason Day (2,3) did not compete due to illness.

2. The top 50 players from the Official World Golf Ranking, as of February 27, 2017
Martin Kaymer (5), Brendan Steele (4)

3. The top 30 players from the final 2016 FedExCup Points List
Roberto Castro, Jason Dufner, Kim Si-woo, Sean O'Hair, Jhonattan Vegas

4. The top 10 players from the 2017 FedExCup Points List, as of February 27, 2017
Mackenzie Hughes, Pat Perez

5. The top 20 players from the final 2016 European Tour Race to Dubai
Ross Fisher, Søren Kjeldsen, Joost Luiten, Thorbjørn Olesen, Andy Sullivan

6. The top 10 players from the 2017 European Tour Race to Dubai, as of February 20, 2017
Sam Brazel, Tommy Fleetwood, Pablo Larrazábal, David Lipsky, Fabrizio Zanotti

7. The top 2 players from the final 2016 Japan Golf Tour Order of Merit
Kim Kyung-tae, Hideto Tanihara

8. The top 2 players from the final 2016 PGA Tour of Australasia Order of Merit
Matthew Griffin, Michael Hendry

9. The top 2 players from the 2016 Sunshine Tour Order of Merit as of December 5
Richard Sterne, Brandon Stone

10. The top 2 players from the final 2016 Asian Tour Order of Merit
Marcus Fraser, Scott Hend

11. The highest ranked available player from Mexico from the Official World Golf Ranking as of February 20, 2017
Roberto Díaz

Round summaries

First round
Thursday, March 2, 2017

Second round
Friday, March 3, 2017

Third round
Saturday, March 4, 2017

Final round
Sunday, March 5, 2017

Scorecard

Final round

References

External links

Coverage on the European Tour's official site

WGC Championship
Golf tournaments in Mexico
Sport in the State of Mexico
Naucalpan de Juárez
WGC-Mexico Championship
WGC-Mexico Championship
WGC-Mexico Championship